Komal Zanzad (born 10 July 1991) is an Indian cricketer who plays for the Vidarbha women's cricket team. In December 2018, in the 2018–19 Senior Women's One Day League match against Haryana, she took nine wickets for eight runs. In January 2019, she was named in India Red's team for the 2018–19 Senior Women's Challenger Trophy.

In February 2019, she was named in India's Women's Twenty20 International (WT20I) squad for their series against England. She was one of two players from Vidarbha women, along with Bharti Fulmali, to be selected for the national team. Ahead of the WT20I fixtures, she played for the Indian Board President's Women XI side in a 50-over warm-up match, impressing selectors with three wickets for fourteen runs from her seven overs.

References

External links
 

1991 births
Living people
Indian women cricketers
Cricketers from Nagpur
IPL Velocity cricketers
Royal Challengers Bangalore (WPL) cricketers